Harry Clay Walker (March 18, 1873 in Binghamton, Broome County, New York – November 2, 1932) was an American lawyer and politician from New York. He was the Lieutenant Governor of New York from 1919 to 1920.

Life
He was the son of William J. Walker and Sarah Walker. He studied law and was admitted to the bar in 1894.

He was Mayor of Binghamton from 1917 to 1918.

He was Lieutenant Governor of New York from 1919 to 1920, elected on the Democratic ticket with Governor Al Smith in 1918. In 1919, he was one of nine members appointed to the Labor Board, created by Governor Al Smith to intervene in labor conflicts, which mediated successfully in a few cases. In 1920, he won the Democratic primary for U.S. Senator from New York defeating George R. Lunn, then Mayor of Schenectady, but lost the election to the incumbent Republican James W. Wadsworth Jr.

In 1926, he was appointed to the Central New York State Parks Commission. In 1928, he was Chairman of the Taconic State Park Commission.

From August 16, 1932, until his death, he was Grand Master of the Grand Encampment of the Knights Templar of the United States of America.

Sources
 Political Graveyard
War-time Strikes and Their Adjustment by Alexander M. Bing (Ayer Publishing, 1971,  ; Page 145)
10,000 Famous Freemasons - Part Two:from K to Z by William R. Denslow & Harry S. Truman (Kessinger Publishing, 2004,  ; page 289)

1873 births
1932 deaths
Lieutenant Governors of New York (state)
Mayors of Binghamton, New York
New York (state) Democrats
Lawyers from Binghamton, New York